Lucius Julius Ursus was a relative of the Flavian dynasty, who was originally one of the equites who held several imperial appointments, but afterwards was promoted to the Roman senate. He was suffect consul three times: once under Domitian and twice under Trajan.

Life 
Ursus was the younger brother of Tiberius Julius Lupus; their father was Julius Lupus, the brother-in-law of the praetorian prefect Marcus Arrecinus Clemens and uncle of Arrecina Tertulla, the wife of the emperor Titus.

This connection led to Ursus being appointed to the three top equestrian posts: Praefectus annonae, or prefect of the grain supply for Rome, then praetorian prefect (81-83 AD), and governor of Roman Egypt (83-84 AD). Upon returning to Rome from Egypt, Arrecina Tertulla convinced her brother-in-law Domitian to grant a consulship to Ursus. He held the fasces for the first time in the nundinium July–August 84 AD; his colleague has not been identified.

According to Dio Cassius, Ursus was a member of Domitian's inner circle at the beginning. When Domitian, early in his reign, planned on having his wife Domitia executed for infidelity, it was Ursus who convinced him not to do so. Later, after Domitian returned home victorious from his campaigns in Germania, Ursus is recorded as "failing to show pleasure" and narrowly avoided being executed for this. After this, Ursus held no important administrative posts during Domitian's reign, but Jones believes he remained an important member of the imperial court.

Ursus must not have been too closely associated with Domitian, for after that emperor's assassination and the ascension of Trajan, Ursus was suffect consul twice more: as the colleague of Trajan in the nundinium March 98 AD; and replacing Trajan as suffect consul for January–February 100 AD with Sextus Julius Frontinus as his colleague.

Adoption 
Ronald Syme has argued that Ursus adopted Servius Julius Servianus, suffect consul in 90 AD, and afterwards Servianus used the name Lucius Julius Ursus Servianus, thus continuing the lineage; no scholar has spoken against this identification, and it has been considered accepted by all. Servianus remained close to the center of power, being part of the imperial courts of Trajan and Hadrian until his death.

References

Further reading 
 Magioncalda Andreina, "La carriera di L. Iulius Ursus e le alte prefetture equestri nel I sec. D.C.", Cahiers du Centre Gustave Glotz, 23 (2012), pp. 113-129

1st-century Romans
1st-century Roman governors of Egypt
Ursus, Lucius
Praetorian prefects
Roman governors of Egypt
Praefecti annonae
Suffect consuls of Imperial Rome